The following highways are numbered 429:

Japan
 Japan National Route 429

United States
  Florida State Road 429
  Nevada State Route 429
  New York State Route 429
  Oregon Route 429
  Puerto Rico Highway 429
  Tennessee State Route 429
 Virginia State Route 429 (former)